This article is a list of community currencies that are, or have been, used in the United Kingdom. There are various models such as complementary currencies, local currencies, Local Exchange Trading Systems (LETS) and Time-based currency:

See also 
 Barter
 List of community currencies in Canada
 List of community currencies in the United States

References

United Kingdom, List of community currencies in the
Local currencies of the United Kingdom
Currencies of the United Kingdom